Laricobius is a genus of beetles in the family Derodontidae, the tooth-necked fungus beetles.

It is one of four genera in the family. While the other three feed on fungi, Laricobius species feed on adelgids, tiny insects very similar to aphids. Some adelgids are destructive forest pests, and Laricobius beetles have been employed as agents of biological pest control to prey on them and reduce their populations. An example is Laricobius nigrinus, which is released in forests to control the hemlock woolly adelgid (Adelges tsugae).

As of 2014, there are about 23 species in the genus. Species include:
Laricobius baoxingensis
Laricobius bicolor
Laricobius caucasicus
Laricobius daliensis
Laricobius danielae
Laricobius erichsonii
Laricobius incognitus
Laricobius jizu
Laricobius kangdingensis
Laricobius kovalevi
Laricobius ludmilae
Laricobius laticollis
Laricobius loebli
Laricobius minutus
Laricobius mirabilis
Laricobius naganoensis
Laricobius nigrinus
Laricobius osakensis
Laricobius rubidus
Laricobius sahlbergi
Laricobius schawalleri
Laricobius taiwanensis
Laricobius wittmeri

References

Derodontidae
Bostrichiformia genera